The 2022 North Queensland Cowboys season was the 28th in the club's history. Coached by Todd Payten and captained by Jason Taumalolo and Chad Townsend, they competed in the NRL's 2022 Telstra Premiership.

The Cowboys returned to the finals after four seasons in the bottom four, finishing one game short of the Grand Final. They finished the regular season in the third position and won 17 games, their equal-highest ever (along with 2015).

Season summary

Milestones
 Round 1: Peta Hiku, Jamayne Taunoa-Brown and Chad Townsend made their debuts for the club.
 Round 1: Tom Gilbert scored his first NRL try.
 Round 2: Mitchell Dunn played his 50th NRL game for the club.
 Round 3: Reece Robson played his 50th NRL game.
 Round 3: Griffin Neame scored his first NRL try.
 Round 10: Reuben Cotter scored his first NRL try.
 Round 10: Peta Hiku scored his first try for the club.
 Round 13: Brendan Elliot made his debut for the club.
 Round 16: Luciano Leilua made his debut for the club.
 Round 16: Luciano Leilua played his 100th NRL game.
 Round 18: Tom Chester made his NRL debut.
 Round 21: Luciano Leilua and Chad Townsend scored their first tries for the club.

Squad

Squad movement

Gains

Losses

Re-signings

Ladder

Fixtures

Pre-season

Regular season

Finals

Statistics

Representatives
The following players played a representative match in 2022.

Honours

League
Dally M Coach of the Year: Todd Payten
Dally M Centre of the Year: Valentine Holmes
Dally M Second Rower of the Year: Jeremiah Nanai
Dally M Rookie of the Year: Jeremiah Nanai
Dally M Try of the Year: Scott Drinkwater

Club
Paul Bowman Medal: Jason Taumalolo
Players' Player: Tom Dearden
The Cowboys Way Award: Tom Dearden
Rookie of the Year: Jeremiah Nanai
JCU Education Award: Scott Drinkwater
Young Guns Cowboys Way Award: Robert Derby
Club Person of the Year: Tom Gilbert
Member's Player of the Year: Jeremiah Nanai

Feeder Clubs

Queensland Cup
 Mackay Cutters - 11th, missed finals
 Northern Pride - 8th, lost elimination final
 Townsville Blackhawks - 10th, missed finals

Women's team

QRL Women's Premiership
 North Queensland Gold Stars - 3rd, Premiers

References

North Queensland Cowboys seasons
North Queensland Cowboys season